Riedlingen is a town in the district (Kreis) of Biberach, Baden-Württemberg, in the south-west of Germany. It is one of the destinations of the Upper Swabian Baroque Route. Riedlingen has approximately 10,000 inhabitants.

Geography 

The town is situated on the river Danube. Furthermore, there it lies in a dale which is created by the extensions of the Swabian Alps.
Around Riedlingen there are seven villages which are part of the urban district. These are called Neufra, Daugendorf, Grüningen, Pflummern, Zwiefaltendorf, Zell and Bechingen.

History 

Riedlingen is probably an Alemannic foundation. The first written reference dates back to 835. The medieval city was built 1247–1255, situated east of the hamlet of the Earl of Veringen. It was a typical town with its foundations kept in rectangular and square roads with the marketplace as the centre.

Even in the late 13th century the city was in possession of the Habsburgs, but which they pledged later. In 1314 the city belonged to the Counts of Hohenberg, later to the lords of  1384 and finally to the Steward of Waldburg [2]. The Reformation in the 16th century initially found strong support by the urban population. However, it could not prevail against the Catholic Church's Counter Reformation. From 1654 to 1658 Riedlingen a Capuchin monastery was built. In 1680 the city was claimed by Austria.

Culture 

In Riedlingen there are many sports clubs, such as the football club TSV Riedlingen which plays in the German "Kreisliga A". The carnival group called "Gole" has many followers. In the town centre there are several bakeries, cafes, and a cinema  which acts as a theatre, stage and cafe within the same building.

The writer Ernst Jünger used to live close to Riedlingen in the Jünger-Haus Wilflingen.

Economy 

The main employers in Riedlingen are the metalworking companies "Silit" and " Feinguss Blank".

Transportation

Train transportation is served by the Ulm–Sigmaringen railway.

Famous people from Riedlingen 
In the history of the city of Riedlingen, eleven people have been honoured so far. Wilfried Steuer and Winfried Aßfalg are the current living honorary citizens.

 1914: Adolf Gröber (1854–1919), Member of the Reichstag and Landtag (Centre Party)
 1917: Carl Buz (1853–1919), professor
 1926: Franz Xaver Maier (1859–1931), mayor 
 1953: Theodor Selig (1874–1967), priest
 1959: Josef Kohler (1879–1967), tax official
 1964: Kilian Fischer (1886–1975), mayor 
 1967: Franz Zeller (1879–1953), teacher
 1967: Odilo Burkart (1899–1979), general director
 1981: Albert Burkart (1898–1982), painter
 1992: Wilfried Steuer (born 1933), former district counsilior, politician (CDU) and former manager in the energy industry
 2010: Winfried Aßfalg, museum director, author, photographer, local historian

Notable people

 Schweikhard of Helfenstein (1539–1599), president of the Reichskammergericht and there imperial governor of Tyrol, also author, publicist and promoter of the Catholic Reform
 Andreas von Jerin (1541–1596), Bishop of Breslau
 Agatha Mahler (born 1604), was the last woman executed in a witch-hunt
 Franz Joseph Christian (1739–1798), sculptor
 Joseph Anton Sauter (1742–1817), religious law expert and university teacher
 Conrad Graf (1782–1851), piano maker
 Frederick Miller (1824–1888), founder of the national brewer  Miller Brewing Company  in Milwaukee
 Adolf Gröber (1854–1919), politician, leader of the Centre Party in the Reichstag
 Gustav Merk (1874–1954), Catholic priest and archivist
 Maria Caspar-Filser (1878–1968), painter
 Willy Missmahl (1885–1964), surgeon
 Wilhelm Broeckel (1887–1957), bank and association director
  Josef Keller (1887–1981), confectioner, considered one of the inventors of the Black Forest gateau
 Emil Münch (1891–1961), local politician, District Chief Executive in Tettnang (1947–1957)
 Albert Burkart (1898–1982), artist
 Ludwig Walz (1898–1989), mayor and Righteous Among the Nations
 Franz Freiherr von Bodman (1908–1945), Obersturmführer and camp doctor in several concentration camps
 Hans-Peter Missmahl (1920–2008), internist
 Helmut Schlegel OFM (born 1943), Franciscans, Priest, meditation teacher, author and lyricist of new sacred songs
 Hans-Peter Mayer (1944), European delegate of the CDU for Niedersachsen
 Eugen Münch (born 1945), entrepreneur, founder of the Rhön-Klinikum
 Franz Schmidberger (born 1946), Catholic priest and Superior of the Society of Saint Pius X
 Wolfgang Schneiderhan (born 1946), officer, former Inspector General of the Bundeswehr
 Peter Schneider (CDU) (born 1958), politician (CDU), Member of Parliament, President of the Savings Banks Association of Baden-Württemberg
 Wolfgang Amann (born 1959), mayor of Geislingen (1998–2014)
 Thomas Tress (born 1966), CEO of Borussia Dortmund, finance and organization
 Mario Gómez (born 1985), VfB Stuttgart and German football player

Those associated with the city 

 Kaspar of Carp to Pflummern and Talheim (1580), the feudal lord of Pflummern
 Richard Lohrmann (1896–1970), forester and conservationists, led from 1946 to 1961, the Forestry Office Riedlingen
 John Zwick ( 1496–1542), pastor in Riedlingen 1522 Reformation attempt
 Ernst Jünger (1895–1998), writer, philosopher, officer and entomologist; died in the district hospital Riedlingen

References

Biberach (district)
Württemberg